Radiodiscus coppingeri is a species of small air-breathing land snail, a terrestrial gastropod mollusk in the family Charopidae. This species is found in Brazil, Argentina, and Chile.

References 

Radiodiscus
Molluscs of South America
Molluscs of Argentina
Molluscs of Brazil
Molluscs of Chile
Gastropods described in 1881
Taxonomy articles created by Polbot